Shoscombe & Single Hill Halt was a small railway station on the Somerset and Dorset Joint Railway serving small villages between Wellow and Radstock, about seven miles south of Bath.

The station was the last to open on the Somerset and Dorset main line, with services beginning on 23 September 1929. It closed with the rest of the line on 7 March 1966 under the Beeching Axe.

The station, sited in the hamlet of Single Hill, consisted of two bare concrete platforms, with ornate oil lamps but without buildings. A small building containing a booking office and a waiting room was provided on the footpath leading to the station.

References

 Somerset Railway Stations, by Mike Oakley, Dovecote Press, 2002.

External links
 Station on navigable O.S. map

Disused railway stations in Somerset
Former Somerset and Dorset Joint Railway stations
Railway stations in Great Britain opened in 1929
Railway stations in Great Britain closed in 1966
Beeching closures in England